The Apostolic Administration of the Caucasus is an apostolic administration (pre-diocesan jurisdiction) of the Latin Church in the Catholic Church, established in 1993, with headquarters in Tbilisi, capital of Georgia.
 
It is exempt, i.e. directly subject to the Holy See, and to its Roman Congregation for the Oriental Churches, not part of any ecclesiastical province. Since 1996, Giuseppe Pasotto is the founding Apostolic Administrator of the Caucasus.

History 
The Apostolic Administration of the Caucasus was erected on 30 December 1993, during the pontificate of Pope John Paul II by the decree Quo aptius of the Congregation for Bishops. to pastorally cover Armenia, Azerbaijan and Georgia, a territory split off from the Apostolic Administration of European Russia.
 
On 11 October 2000, it lost jurisdiction over Azerbaijan, which was transferred to the newly erected then Mission sui iuris of Baku, which soon was promoted to Apostolic prefecture.

It enjoyed papal visits by Pope John Paul II (July 1999, November 1999 and September 2001)  and Pope Francis (June, September and October 2016).

Cathedral see 
The cathedral episcopal see of the Apostolic Administration is the Cathedral of the Assumption of the Virgin in Tbilisi (capital of Georgia), dedicated to the Assumption of the Blessed Virgin Mary.

Territory 
The Apostolic Administration of the Caucasus pastorally serves Catholics of the Roman Rite of the whole of Armenia and Georgia (including Adjara), and the partially recognized states of Abkhazia and South Ossetia.

Catholics of Armenian rite of the Armenian Catholic Church, one of the Eastern Catholic Churches of the Catholic Church, are however within the Ordinariate of Eastern Europe, which is headquartered in Gyumri, Armenia.

Statistics 
As of 2014, it pastorally served 50,000 Catholics in 11 parishes with 23 priests (15 diocesan, 8 religious), 41 lay religious (13 brothers, 28 sisters) and 4 seminarians.

Episcopal ordinaries
 Giuseppe Pasotto, Stigmatines (C.S.S.) (1996.11.29 – ...), Titular Bishop of Musti (1999.11.09 – ...), born 1954.07.06 in Italy, ordained Priest 1979.05.12, consecrated Bishop 2000.01.06

References

Sources and external links
 GCatholic, with Google map
 Catholic-hierarchy.org

Apostolic administrations
Catholic Church in Georgia (country)
Catholic Church in Armenia